ibn ʿAlī was reportedly the son of Ali and . He was among companions of Husayn who was martyred at the Battle of Karbala.

Lineage 
It is stated that Abu Bakr was the first of Ali ibn Abi Talib's children who fought in the battlefield on the Day of Ashura to support his brother, Husayn ibn Ali. His teknonym was Abu Bakr.  According to the Sunni scholar Ibn Qutaybah, his mother was Layla bint Mas'ud, the daughter of Mas'ud al-Nahshali and his father was Ali ibn Abi Talib.

In the Battle of Karbala 
Abu Bakr ibn Ali was martyred at the Battle of Karbala. There is a hadith from Muhammad al-Baqir according to which a man from the Hamdan tribe martyred him. However, some scholars hold that Abu Bakr's corpse was found in a creek, and so it is not known who martyred him. According to some sources, his grave is located in the mass grave of Hashimid martyrs in the Holy Shrine of Imam al-Husayn near his burial place.

Abu Bakr ibn Ali is mentioned in one of Imam al-Husayn ziyarat.

References 

Hussainiya
Children of Rashidun caliphs
People killed at the Battle of Karbala